Pana or PANA may refer to:

Pana (mythology), a god in Inuit religion
PANA, in telecommunications, a Plain ANAlog loop Alarm circuit
Protocol for carrying Authentication for Network Access, a network access authentication protocol
Pana, used for PanaPress of Pan African NewsAgency
Another name for punch marked coins used in India until the third century
Pana, the term for a snow knife in Inuktitut
Pana language, a language spoken in the Central African Republic
Pa Na language, a language spoken in Hunan, China
Pana language (Gur), a language spoken in Burkina Faso and Mali
Pana Wave or Pana Wave Laboratory, a Japanese new religious group
"Pana" (song), a 2016 single by Tekno

People
Paná (footballer), Angolan footballer

Places
Pana, Burkina Faso, a village in Balé Province, Burkina Faso
Pana, Gabon
Pana, Tibet
Pana, Illinois, United States
Pana, Ontario, Canada
Paňa, a village in Nitra District, Slovakia
Pana, Indonesia
Pa-na, Burma

Other uses
Pana, a slang term for St Patrick's Street in Cork, Ireland

See also
Panna (disambiguation)
Panar (disambiguation)